Arthur Carracher (9 July 1867 – 15 October 1935) was an Australian cricketer. He played two first-class matches for South Australia in 1896/97.

See also
 List of South Australian representative cricketers

References

External links
 

1867 births
1935 deaths
Australian cricketers
South Australia cricketers